Montvale is an active commuter railroad station in the borough of Montvale, Bergen County, New Jersey. Located in the middle of an active road junction of East Grand Avenue (County Route 94) and Kinderkamack Road (County Route 503), the station serves trains on New Jersey Transit's Pascack Valley Line, serving as the first/last stop in New Jersey. The station consists of one low-level side platform with a mini-high-level platform to service handicapped customers under the Americans with Disabilities Act of 1990.

History 
Railroad service in Montvale began on May 27, 1871, when railroad service from Hillsdale was extended to the junction with the Erie Railroad Piermont Branch at Nanuet on the Hackensack and New York Extension Railroad. The original station depot at Montvale exploded on October 11, 1921 when a local pyrotechnic lit the station and a nearby real estate office on fire that morning, resulting in complete demolition of the building.

Station layout

The station has one track and one low-level side platform.

Permit parking is operated by the Borough of Montvale. There are three permit parking lots available, with 60, 11 and 139 parking spots, respectively.

References

External links

Station House from Google Maps Street View
 Station from Kinderkamack Road from Google Maps Street View

Montvale, New Jersey
NJ Transit Rail Operations stations
Railway stations in Bergen County, New Jersey
Former Erie Railroad stations
Railway stations in the United States opened in 1871
1871 establishments in New Jersey